Frank Cyril Butterworth (23 November 1914 – July 1999) was an English amateur footballer who played in non-League football for Barking and Walthamstow Avenue. He made two FA Cup appearances for Leeds United in 1946 and made over 100 appearances for the club during the Second World War.

Personal life 
Butterworth was stationed in Leeds during the course of his service with the British Armed Forces during the Second World War.

Career statistics

References 

English footballers

Clapton Orient F.C. wartime guest players
1914 births
1999 deaths
Footballers from Barking, London
Barking F.C. players
Leeds United F.C. wartime guest players
Watford F.C. wartime guest players
Walthamstow Avenue F.C. players
Association football wing halves
Isthmian League players
British military personnel of World War II